The Queen Elizabeth Ranges is a group of mountain ranges in the Canadian Rockies on the southeastern side of Jasper National Park, Canada. The northern end of the ranges begins east of Medicine Lake and extends in a southeasterly direction past the southern shore of Maligne Lake. The group was named in 1953 to celebrate the coronation of Elizabeth II as Canada's sovereign.

These ranges include the following mountains and peaks:

References

Mountains of Jasper National Park
Mountain ranges of Alberta
Queen Elizabeth Ranges